God Help the Child is the 11th novel by American writer Toni Morrison. News of the book, as well as the title and opening line, were released in December 2014. The novel's original title, preferred by Morrison herself, is The Wrath of Children.

Release
On February 9, 2015, The New Yorker published an excerpt from the work under the title "Sweetness".

God Help the Child was first published by Alfred A. Knopf on April 30, 2015.

Plot
A young girl with blue-black skin is neglected and abused by the light-skinned parents who are ashamed of her. Lula Ann Bridewell, who calls herself "Bride", is blue-black beautiful, the kind of woman who turns heads wherever she goes. She is tall, elegant, and dresses only in white, the better to reflect her beauty.

But Bride did not always know her beauty or how to wear it. As a child, her mother Sweetness punished Bride for her dark skin, which ended her marriage. Sweetness's husband Louis could not bring himself to love a child with skin as dark as Bride's. "We had three good years," Sweetness tells us, "but when she was born, he blamed me and treated Lula Ann like she was a stranger, more than that, an enemy." Her mother, meanwhile, insisted her child call her Sweetness instead of anything maternal.

Bride grew up without love, tenderness, affection or apology. Sweetness makes it clear she saw herself as protecting her child from a world that would be even more inclined to punish Bride for the darkness of her skin. While Sweetness will apologize for her child's dark skin, what she will not apologize for is how she sees the world and how she raises her child, saying: "Some of you probably think it's a bad thing to group ourselves according to skin color – the lighter, the better – in social clubs, neighborhoods, churches, sororities, even colored schools. But how else can we hold on to a little dignity?" This is what makes it so difficult to judge Sweetness's choices. She should know better, but it is painfully clear her choices have been shaped by the realities of being black in a white world – a world where the lighter your skin, the higher you might climb.

Reception
Morrison and her publishers announced they were publishing the book in December 2014, causing Gawker to jokingly proclaim it the best novel of 2015 based on the synopsis and Morrison's previous work alone. The novel was listed by publications including The Globe and Mail, Publishers Weekly and The New York Times as one of their most anticipated book releases of 2015.

Upon release, the novel received mixed reviews. Artist Kara Walker writing for The New York Times negatively compared the novel to previous works by Morrison, saying that “the abundance of first-person confessionals does little to invite actual intimacy.” Ron Charles writing for The Washington Post compared the novel unfavorably to Morrison's debut novel The Bluest Eye (1970), criticizing the characters in her latest work as people with "no interior life". Similarly the review by Razia Iqbal for The Independent complained that the characters were "too didactic on the page: prototypes for an idea rather than real people."

References

Novels by Toni Morrison
2015 American novels
African-American novels
Alfred A. Knopf books